Trajanopolis or Traianopolis ( Traianoupolis) may refer to several cities named after Trajan:

Traianopolis in Cilicia, a former name of Gazipaşa, Turkey
Traianopolis in Phrygia, a former city in Turkey
Traianopolis in Thrace, a city in Greece

See also 
 Augusta Traiana, a Roman city on the site of present-day Stara Zagora, Bulgaria